Fude can refer to

 Tudigong
 Ofuda
 Ink brush, the Japanese name of the brush used in Japanese calligraphy